Ali Reza Noori (or sometimes Ali-Reza Nouri) (April 8, 1962 in Isfahan – October 31, 2002) was a member of the 6th Iranian parliament and a supporter of President Mohammad Khatami's reform programs. He was the brother of Abdollah Noori. Dr. Ali Reza Noori was educated in medicine and was a practicing physician before entering politics.

Noori was killed in a car accident in northern Iran during his term in the parliament. Allegations of conspiracy surrounded the tragic accident in which another reformist member of the parliament, Masoud Hashemi Zehi, from Khash, Sistan-Baluchistan, was also killed.

Sources
Details of the car crash claiming lives of two MPs

1962 births
2002 deaths
Iranian reformists
Road incident deaths in Iran
Politicians from Isfahan
Members of the 6th Islamic Consultative Assembly
Deputies of Tehran, Rey, Shemiranat and Eslamshahr
Islamic Iran Participation Front politicians
Iranian physicians

Isfahan University of Medical Sciences alumni